The Fall is the fourth studio album by British virtual band Gorillaz. It was announced on 20 December 2010 and released as a download for members of the Gorillaz fan club on 25 December 2010. This was followed by a wider physical release of the album on 19 April 2011.

Co-founder Damon Albarn recorded The Fall during the North American leg of the Escape to Plastic Beach Tour using an iPad and a few additional instruments. The album features fewer guest artists than previous Gorillaz albums; collaborators include Bobby Womack, and Mick Jones and Paul Simonon of The Clash. Critics praised the album's experimental qualities but felt that it lacked the feel of previous Gorillaz albums. It charted in various countries and peaked at number 24 on the Billboard 200.

Recording
The Fall was recorded on group co-founder Damon Albarn's iPad over 32 days during the North American leg of the Escape to Plastic Beach World Tour in October 2010 and mixed in England by Stephen Sedgwick. Other instruments that were used includes a qanun, a Korg vocoder, a ukulele, a microKORG, an Omnichord, a Minimoog Voyager, a melodica, a guitar, a piano and a Korg Monotron. Albarn said of the recording: "I literally made it on the road. I didn't write it before, I didn't prepare it. I just did it day by day as a kind of diary of my experience in America. If I left it until the New Year to release it then the cynics out there would say, 'Oh well, it's been tampered with', but if I put it out now they'd know that I haven't done anything because I've been on tour ever since."

The album includes four guest artists, three of which have worked with Albarn before. Mick Jones and Bobby Womack appeared on the previous Gorillaz album Plastic Beach, as did Paul Simonon, who also worked on Albarn's project The Good, the Bad & the Queen. American singer-songwriter Pharrell Williams of N.E.R.D. recorded a track with Albarn while touring together which did not appear on the album.

Release and promotion
The album was first announced on 20 December 2010 as a holiday gift to fans. On 22 December, the music video for "Phoner to Arizona", which consists of a compilation of footage and images taken from the tour and the phase, was posted on YouTube as a way to promote the album. The album was first released to stream for free on the Gorillaz website on 25 December; it was available as a download for paying members of the band's Sub-Division club, a premium access campaign the band ran throughout 2010. The album was given an official release on 19 April 2011.

Reception

The Fall received mixed to positive reviews from critics. At Metacritic, which assigns a normalised rating out of 100 to reviews from mainstream critics, The Fall has an average score of 67, based on 25 reviews, which indicates "generally favorable reviews". Aggregator AnyDecentMusic? gave the album a 6.6 out of 10, based on their assessment of the critical consensus. Praise focused on the album's unique qualities and experimental nature, with Rolling Stone stating that the album was "a wistfully spaced-out, subtly cheeky spin on the road-trip epic" and NME calling it "quiet but ambitious". However, some critics felt that it lacked the offerings of previous Gorillaz albums, with The Guardian stating that it was "oddly out of character" compared to Plastic Beach.

Track listing

Sample credits
 "The Parish of Space Dust" contains samples of "Cowboy Town" as written by Ronnie Dunn, Larry Boone and Paul Nelson and performed by Brooks and Dunn, "Wichita Lineman", as written by Jimmy Webb and performed by Glen Campbell, and "Hawaiian War Chant (Ta-Hu-Wa-Hu-Wai)" as written by Prince Leleiohoku and performed by Spike Jones.
"Seattle Yodel" features the Yodelling Pickle, made by the novelty retailer Archie McPhee.

Personnel
Credits adapted from the liner notes for The Fall and Tidal.

Musicians
 Damon Albarn – vocals , synthesizers , vocoder , piano, guitar, Omnichord, ukulele, melodica
 Mick Jones – guitar 
 Jesse Hackett – keyboards 
 Darren Evans – vocals 
 Mike Smith – piano 
 Paul Simonon – bass 
 James R Grippo – qanun 
 Bobby Womack – vocals, guitar

Technical
 Damon Albarn – production , recording 
 Stephen Sedgwick – production, recording, mixing
 Geoff Pesche – mastering
 Mike Smith – recording

Artwork
 Jamie Hewlett – artwork, design, photography
 Zombie Flesh Eaters – artwork, design
 Mike Smith – photography
 Seb Monk – photography
 Oswald Lee Henderson – photography

Charts

Weekly charts

Year-end charts

References

2010 albums
Albums free for download by copyright owner
Albums produced by Damon Albarn
Gorillaz albums
Parlophone albums
Virgin Records albums
Record Store Day releases